Vilmos Huszár (5 January 1884 – 8 September 1960) was a Hungarian painter and designer. He lived in The Netherlands, where he was one of the founding members of the art movement De Stijl.

Huszár was born in Budapest, Hungary. He emigrated to The Netherlands in 1905, settling at first in Voorburg. He was influenced by Cubism and Futurism. He met other influential artists including Piet Mondrian and Theo van Doesburg, both central figures in establishing the De Stijl movement with Huszár in 1917. Huszár also co-founded the De Stijl magazine and designed the cover for the first issue.

In 1918 he designed interior colour schemes for the bedroom of Bruynzeel house in Voorburg. From 1920 to 1921 he collaborated with Piet Zwart on furniture designs. He left the De Stijl group in 1923. He collaborated with Gerrit Rietveld on an exhibition interior for the Greater Berlin Art Exhibition. From 1925, Huszár concentrated on graphic design and painting.

In 1926 he created a complete visual identity for Miss Blanche Virginia cigarettes, which included packaging, advertising, and point of sale displays. The concept drew on the imagery associated with the emergent "New Women", or Flappers. The Flappers were perceived as young, single, urban, and employed, with independent ideas and a certain disdain for authority and social norms. The smoking of cigarettes was closely associated with their newfound independence.

Huszár's work was included in the 1939 exhibition and sale Onze Kunst van Heden (Our Art of Today) at the Rijksmuseum in Amsterdam.

The whereabouts of many of Huszár's works are unknown. Many of his paintings and sculptures are only known through photographs that appeared in De Stijl, or from photographs taken by the artist himself. Works that are lost include the Dancing mechanical doll, a device that could adopt several different postures and was used during Dada conferences in the early 1920s.

Huszár died in the Dutch town Harderwijk in 1960.

From 8 March to 19 May 1985 a large Huszár retrospective was held at the Gemeentemuseum in The Hague.

In 2021 an exceptional Vilmos Huszar Sculpture was discovered at a hungarian collector, Peter Lozsy. Very excited , because this is the only known exist sculpture was made by the artist. The art first have been shown on a parisian "Lost and Found" Exhibition.

References

External links 
Artcyclopedia Links to Vilmos Huszár's works
Brief biography
Short biography (in german)
Video reconstruction of 'Mechanical Dancing Figure' by Huszár in 1922
La Gazette/Drouot
The only known Vilmos Huszar Sculpture's Owner's Collection

Abstract painters
Cubist artists
1884 births
1960 deaths
De Stijl
20th-century Hungarian painters
Hungarian male painters
20th-century Hungarian male artists